Park Soo-ah (born Park Soo-young on July 31, 1992), previously known by the stage name Lizzy, is a South Korean singer and actress. She debuted as a new member of girl group After School (and later, its sub-unit Orange Caramel) in March 2010. Apart from her group's activities, she has also starred in various television dramas, including All My Love (2011) and Angry Mom (2015). She debuted as a solo artist with the digital single "Not an Easy Girl" in January 2015.

In May 2018, she graduated from After School following the expiration of her contract, but remains a member of Orange Caramel. In July 2018, she was announced to have changed her promotion name to Park Soo-ah.

Early life and education
Lizzy was born on July 31, 1992, in Busan, South Korea. She attended Kyung Hee University, majoring in Post Modern Music.

Career

2009–2010: Career beginnings
Lizzy served as Son Dam-bi's backup dancer in 2009. She was first hinted to be joining After School when she joined the members on stage to perform a cover of Fin.K.L.'s "To My Boyfriend" at their first fan meeting event in 2010, while donning a mask to keep her identity a secret. Lizzy made her official debut as a member of After School when they released their third single "Bang!" on March 25, 2010. She was the youngest member of the group until E-Young joined the group in December 2010. In June 2010, Lizzy and her fellow After School members Raina and Nana formed a sub-unit named Orange Caramel and released their first mini-album featuring the lead single "Magic Girl".

2011–2017: Television roles and solo debut
In 2011, Lizzy was briefly a cast member of the SBS variety show, Running Man. That same year, she made her acting debut as a supporting character on MBC's sitcom, All My Love. Her role in Running Man was often edited out, and she eventually left to focus on All My Love. In November 2012, Lizzy was cast in MBC's weekend drama Rascal Sons, where she had a more significant role.

In December 2012, Lizzy and indie rapper Andup released a collaborative single, "Cosmetic", for their single album Cupcake Project. In the same month, Lizzy joined Sistar's Bora, 4Minute's Gayoon, Secret's Sunhwa and Kara's Jiyoung to form the project girl group Mystic White for the 2012 SBS Gayo Daejun. They performed their single "Mermaid Princess" on the show, and the song's profits were donated to people in need.

In July 2013, Lizzy made a cameo appearance in a Japanese horror drama Evil Spirit Ward, playing the role of a Korean foreign student named Tehi. In 2014, she played a hair stylist named Hyeni in the film Momo Salon. The film consisted of six ten-minute episodes, and was released on Naver TV Cast on September 2.

In December 2014, Lizzy was cast as a member of the second season of Jeong Hyeong-don and Defconn's show, Hitmaker. Lizzy, G.NA, 4Minute's Kwon So-hyun and Kara's Heo Young-ji became a girl group called Chamsonyeo (참소녀) for the show. The show began airing on January 16, 2015. She also had a supporting role in the film Love Forecast, which was released on January 15. That same month, Lizzy replaced Kim Sung-eun as a co-MC of the food variety show, Tasty Road.

On January 23, 2015, Lizzy debuted as a solo singer with the trot song "Not An Easy Girl" (쉬운 여자 아니에요). The music video used footage from the 1961 film adaptation of Chunhyangga, with Lizzy playing the protagonist. On February 11, she released a duet song, "Goodbye PMS", with comedian Park Myung-soo. The song was written by Duble Sidekick, who said PMS (which usually means premenstrual syndrome) refers to "a monster that creates all the worries and stress suffered by a high school girl." Lizzy also had a supporting role in MBC's drama Angry Mom, which aired from March to May.

In 2017, she joined as Main MC on the first season of  My Daughter's Men, being the only woman in the cast.

2018–present: Acting career and legal troubles
On May 1, 2018, Lizzy graduated from After School following the expiration of her contract. On May 10, Lizzy joined Celltrion Entertainment. On July 3 it was announced that Lizzy had changed her promotional name to 'Park Soo-ah', and was cast in the web drama I Picked Up a Celebrity on the Street. On September 12,  it was revealed by  Celltrion Entertainment that Park Soo Ah had joined the main cast of the upcoming SBS drama Fates & Furies alongside Lee Min-jung, Joo Sang-wook, So Yi-hyun and Lee Ki-woo. The drama began to air on December 1. She also had a cameo in Devilish Charm.

In 2019, she was cast in the app drama, Kim Seul Gi Genius, which was scheduled to be released in May 2019, due to the delay in 2018. She is also part of the tvN's comedy drama, Ugly Miss Young-ae 17.

On May 18, 2021, Park hit a taxi with her car while driving in Cheongdam-dong, a neighborhood of Seoul. Upon the arrival of law enforcement at the scene, she was determined to have a blood alcohol content of 0.08. As a result, she was charged with a DUI and had her driver's license revoked. In August 2021, Celltrion Entertainment announced that Park Soo-Ah's contract had expired, and after coming to an agreement between both parties, it would not be renewed.

In October 2022, Park signed with new agency BK Entertainment.

Discography

Singles

Other songs

Filmography

Film

Television drama

Variety show

References

External links

1992 births
Living people
After School (band) members
Kyung Hee University alumni
Orange Caramel members
People from Busan
South Korean dance musicians
South Korean women pop singers
South Korean film actresses
South Korean female idols
South Korean television actresses
21st-century South Korean singers
21st-century South Korean women singers